Bogojević Selo is a Serbian village in the municipality of Trebinje, Republika Srpska, Bosnia and Herzegovina.

Geography
The village is located near the international border crossings with Croatia and Montenegro.

Demographics
In 1991, the village had 68 inhabitants, all of whom declared as Serbs.

People
Luka Vukalović, rebel
Tripko Vukalović, rebel

References

Populated places in Trebinje